Monquirasaurus ("Monquirá lizard") is an extinct genus of giant short-necked pliosaurs who lived during the Late Cretaceous (Aptian) in what is now Colombia. One species is known, M. boyacensis, described in 2021 from an almost complete fossil skeleton, discovered in 1977 in the town of Villa de Leyva, located in Boyacá. Published descriptions of the holotype specimen estimate that it should reach a total size approaching  in length, making Monquirasaurus a large representative of the pliosaurids.

The taxon has long been informally identified as a species belonging to the related genus Kronosaurus, even being named Kronosaurus boyacensis in a study published in 1992. This identification was due to the fact that the holotype specimen was banned from local access, and the descriptions were published with the help of photos. It is not until 2021 that a more complete description of the skeleton is made, confirming that it belongs to a separate genus.

The site where Monquirasaurus was discovered is the Paja Formation, that was once an environment containing a vast diversity of marine reptiles, including other large related pliosaurs, such as Stenorhynchosaurus and Sachicasaurus.

History and naming
Excavations were conducted by geologists, archaeologists and palaeontologists from the Instituto Colombiano de Geología y Minería (now Servicio Geológico Colombiano), the Instituto Colombiano de Antropología e Historia and the Universidad Nacional de Colombia. Locally the specimen soon became known as "El Fósil", before being formally described as Kronosaurus boyacensis by Hampe in 1992 after being informally attributed to Kronosaurus in the years prior. This description however was conducted using photographs and remote imaging techniques, as the Junta de Acción Comunal and local community did not allow access to the holotype specimen, resulting in a lacking and untrustworthy description. It wasn't until 2021 that the specimen was reexamined first hand and described as a distinct genus, Monquirasaurus boyacensis. The holotype specimen still remains in the type locality, with the local "Museo El Fósil" having been built around the fossil.

The generic name derives from Monquirá, the Vereda (administrative division) where the holotype has been discovered. Similarly, the species name refers to the Boyacá Department.

Description

Skull
When viewed from the side the cranium is elongated and low, however it is still severely crushed. The jaws of the holotype are tightly closed and most of the dentition is preserved in situ. The cranium does not only suffer from crushing, but most of the dorsal surface is also heavily weathered and many bones are missing, making it almost impossible to observe most of the skull sutures. The skull has undulating margins, with 3 lateral expansions visible in dorsal view. The first is present along the lateral margins of the premaxilla, followed by an expansion around the large anterior caniniforms and one just beneath the orbits. A 4th expansion was probably also present in the posterior area of the skull, around the lateral margins of the temporal fenestra. Both anterior expansions are immediately followed by a medial constriction of the cranium. The mandible is preserved in better condition than the cranium, largely resisting the crushing that affected the latter. There is however still some dorsoventral compression present around the mandibular rami.

 
The mandible is robust and resembles classic pliosaurid morphology with large caniniform teeth housed at the anterior margin of the bone. The anterior portion is slightly upturned and expanded as in Simolestes and Acostasaurus. The teeth of Monquirasaurus are round in cross section with the largest being the caniniforms. The anterior dentition is markedly anisiodont and interlocking, while more posterior areas of the skull have tooth rows overlapping. The anterior caniniforms of the maxilla for instance obscure the dentary teeth of that region, while further posterior the dentary teeth form a pronounced underbite obscuring the posterior maxillary teeth. All of this makes it difficult to determine the original tooth count of the animal. The anterior expansion of the premaxilla contains 4 teeth on each side, with premaxillary tooth 2 being the largest, extending halfway down the mandible. While the 3rd and 4th tooth are both large in their own right, they are still smaller than the preceding tooth. Some uncertainty surrounds the presence of a small tooth just behind the 4th premaxillary. This area is almost entirely obscured by the 4th dentary caniniform, however there is a hint of a small alveolous in that area. While the absence of visible sutures makes the separation of premaxillary and maxillary dentition uncertain, Noè and Gómez-Pérez suggest that, if a small tooth would have been present, it would most likely been a maxillary. They reason that all pliosaurids of the Paja Formation are united through the presence of 4 premaxillary teeth, while furthermore pointing out that the first maxillary tooth in pliosaurs is oftentimes much smaller and followed by a large caniniform (such as the next preserved tooth in Monquirasaurus). Between the last preserved premaxillary and first maxillary caniniform extends a toothless gap or diastema, equivalent in diameter to the area taken up by a large tooth. The first preserved (potentially second overall) maxillary tooth is the largest in the jaw, although broken on either side this tooth is inferred to have reached beyond the ventral margin of the mandible. Following this tooth are continuously smaller caniniforms followed by many much smaller maxillary teeth that progressively grow smaller towards the posterior. The anterior mandibular teeth are large and interlocking with the premaxillary teeth. The largest of these is the 4th dentary, which is still smaller than the later maxillary caniniforms, but larger than any of the premaxillary teeth. The dentary teeth after the small 5th tooth are obscured by the maxillary caniniforms, however most likely also rather small. Larger dentary teeth are preserved posterior to this overlap. Overall Monquirasaurus may have had a minimum of 19 teeth in its upper jaw whilte the mandibles preserve 19 tooth positions on the right and 23 on the left.

Postcranial skeleton
 
As preserved, the body was broad, however in life it would have been narrower. The vertebral column is largely preserved in articulation, with some gaps towards the posterior end of the body. The neck of Monquirasaurus was short, with 8 articulated vertebrae preserved excluding the atlas-axis complex, which is obscured by the cranium (the presence of a third vertebra obscured by the cranium is possible, but not certain). The cervical series is followed by 3 pectoral, 22 dorsal and 3 sacral vertebrae. Out of these vertebrae, the last dorsal and first 2 sacrals are only preserved as impressions. The preserved neural arch of the 17th and 18th vertebrae (dorsals 5 and 6) are dorsally subtriangular, narrow anteriorly and flattened posteriorly, suggesting a "tongued-and-grooved" interlocking arrangement. This would make the back stiff and rigid, as in other plesiosaurians. Most of the tail is missing, with only 3 preserved caudal vertebrae articulating with the sacrals. The appendicular skeleton is only partly preserved, with all limbs missing the distal end of the flippers and girdles obscure by the overlaying torso.

Phylogeny
Although Noè and Gómez-Pérez did not conduct a phylogenetic analysis, comparison of the morphology of Monquirasaurus and the morphology of Pliosaurid families suggests that while it was certainly a member of the Pliosauridae, it's considered unlikely to be a member of Brauchaucheniinae, which was previously considered the only Cretaceous pliosaurid lineage. The authors instead suggest that it, alongside Sachicasaurus and Acostosaurus, may have been part of a unrecognized lower Cretaceous non-Brauchaucheniin family of pliosaurs. However more extensive phylogenetic analysis are required to support this hypothesis.

Paleobiology
Monquirasaurus was found in the Arcillolitas abigarradas member of the Paja Formation. This formation preserves a shoreface to lower shoreface environment with a great diversity of marine reptiles including elasmosaurids, protostegid and sandownid marine turtles, large bodied teleosaurids and various ichthyosaurs including the macropredatory Kyhytysuka which was also described in 2021. The formation is also known for its diversity in pliosaurs specifically, with 4 distinct genera being known from the region. Besides Monquirasaurus, the formation preserves the bones of the relatively small Acostasaurus and Stenorhynchosaurus as well as the giant Sachicasaurus.

Notes

References

Pliosaurids
Early Cretaceous plesiosaurs
Aptian life
Barremian life
Early Cretaceous reptiles of South America
Cretaceous Colombia
Fossils of Colombia
Paja Formation
Altiplano Cundiboyacense
Fossil taxa described in 2021
Sauropterygian genera